Fausto Cruzat y Góngora († 14th of June 1702, on the Pacific, aboard the Acapulco galleon) was a Spanish Governor-General of the Philippines from 1690 to 1701, therefore the second longest serving governor after Rafael María de Aguilar (governor from 1793 to 1806).  
He is thought to be one of the most capable of the Spanish colonial officials in his day.

Biography 
Fausto Cruzat y Góngora was born in Pamplona into a distinguished family in the nobility of Navarre.
He became a soldier and a knight of the Order of Santiago.
He arrived in the Philippines in July 1690, assuming control of the government from the Audience of Manila.
He immediately began the task of overhauling the administration, improving and streamlining the administration of taxes.
He settled a large debt owed to Mexico, and reduced expenses to the level that the islands could become self-sufficient.
He rebuilt the governor's palace in Manila on its present site, with two wings separated by an open atrium.
His residence was on the second floor of the south wing, and his secretariat on the lower floor.  
The northern wing was occupied by the Real Audiencia or Supreme Court.

On 1 October 1696 he issued a new set of Governance Rules, based on rules drawn up fifty years before by Sebastián Hurtado de Corcuera.
The rules ensured that Alcaldes Mayores and other local authorities were strictly subordinate to the central government and that no major decision was taking without approval by Manila.  Mechanisms to prevent corruption included a prohibition on accepting gifts.
The rules instituted annual inspections by the Alcaldes Mayores in their territories.
The Filipinos were given greater legal rights and guarantees, and were allowed to engage in industry or commerce.

Cruzat had to deal with disputes within the church. In late 1697 the Archbishop appointed secular clergy to the parishes, but the monks refused to give up control of the churches.
Governor Cruzat sent soldiers to occupy the churches by force. This did not solve the problem, because there were not enough secular clergy, so most of the people were without priests. 
The problem remained until the archbishop was transferred to headquarters in Guadalajara, Mexico, in 1706.
Another problem arose when the crown ordered the regularization of all land property titles.
The religious orders were by far the largest landholders, but they refused to show the inspector their titles.
Two bishops became involved on different sides in the dispute, one supporting the monks and the other the inspector.
The argument mounted to the point where the bishops mutually excommunicated each other.  It took all of Cruzat's tact to obtain a compromise and restore peaces among the prelates.

Philip V of Spain, the first monarch of the House of Bourbon, inherited the crown on 1 November 1700.  Fausto Cruzat was replaced as governor by Domingo Zabálburu de Echevarri in December 1701.
He died on 14 June 1702 on his way back, aboard of the Acapulco galeon.
His son Juan Cruzat y Góngora was made Marques de Góngora.
His grandson Gervasio Cruzat y Góngora became governor of New Mexico.

References
Citations

Sources

17th-century Spanish people
Captains General of the Philippines